Rocco Lo Presti (born Rocco Lopresti May 6, 1937 – January 23, 2009), known in Marina di Gioiosa Ionica, his town of origin as "Roccu u Maneja", was an Italian crime boss of the 'Ndrangheta, a Mafia-type organization in Calabria, Italy, but his criminal base was Bardonecchia, in Piedmont region. He was the head in command of the Lo Presti crime family.     
 
Historical 'Ndrangheta boss of Bardonecchia and Val di Susa, was the Godfather of the 'Ndrangheta in Piedmont. Lo Presti was the first mobster sent in soggiorno obbligato (coerced stay), in northern Italy. Bardonecchia is an alpine town in the province of Turin, in Piedmont, on the border with France and one of the main ski resorts in Italy. For judges of Turin, Lo Presti was instead one who imported the phenomenon of 'Ndrangheta, in northern Italy. He was the man who, during the building boom years in Piedmont, imposed the rule of labor building throughout Val di Susa. Over the years in the 1960s and 1970s, his power in Piedmont, engrossed similar to that of Antonio Macri in Calabria. He had the hegemony on the Val di Susa territory, with his cousin Don Ciccio Francesco Mazzaferro. During the building boom years before, and the kidnapping-murder Ceretto then, Lo Presti had the absolute power in the construction industry and underworld in Piedmont until 1975, when he was sent into internal exile in the prison on the island of Asinara. In the history of the 'Ndrangheta infiltration in Piedmont, between 1965 and 1975, he was investigated several times. Related to the Mazzaferro 'ndrina of Marina di Gioiosa Ionica, of which he was an important exponent, he moved to Piedmont in the late 1950s by the subalpine town. Many politicians turned reverently to him during election campaigns. He had ties with the clan of Marseille and with all the major crime families of Calabria and Sicily. Lo Presti entertained friendly relations with Don Mico Domenico Tripodo when was in soggiorno obbligato (coerced stay) in Avigliana. Tripodo presence was frequently reported in Bardonecchia. He also had contacts with Don Giovanni Stilo of Africo, the calabrian priest who was repeatedly accused of collusion with the 'Ndrangheta, on the occasion of the adjustment of the Ceretto trial. He has had ties to the Sicilian and American mafia.  Luciano Liggio, Salvatore Inzerillo, Frank Coppola (mobster), Gerlando Alberti, the Gambino crime family of New York and the families of the 'Ndrangheta in Canada. According to a witness of justice, in recent years, the relationship with his cousins, the Mazzaferro 'ndrina, has cracked, and Lo Presti has approached and allied with the Aquinos, rivals of the Mazzaferros.

Biography
Lo Presti was born on May 6, 1937, in Marina di Gioiosa Ionica from a humble peasant family. The father Salvatore Lopresti and the mother Maria Caterina Femia make do as they can, working the land. The first of eight children, he leaves elementary school very early and joins his uncle, in close contact with the capobastone (head of command) of Gioiosa Ionica, Rocco Amleto Monteleone, known as " Roccu u Regginu ", managing the business of his uncle and Monteleone, in the market fruit first, and fish after. 

At the age of 16, he left Calabria and moved to Piedmont together with his cousins, the Mazzaferro brothers. 

In 1957 he was arrested in Casale Monferrato for selling counterfeit money, together his cousin Cosimo Ierinò, known as " Cosimu u Caddara".

In 1963 he was sent to stay in soggiorno obbligato in Bardonecchia and booming construction puts on a small construction company. In September of the same year, Mario Corino, unionist and future mayor of Bardonecchia was attacked and beaten at night by strangers. The police arrested for the attack, two calabrese workers. Francesco Ursino, brother-in-law of Lo Presti, and Antonio Zucco, originally from Ciminà. Questioned by the judge, the two declared to have beaten Corino, because he was an Italian Labor Union spy. Lo Presti had been the instigator. 

In 1965 he was arrested in Geneva by the Swiss gendarmery, with Alberto Re, an entrepreneur of Bardonecchia, for a series of thefts in the villas. They were arrested for the last shot they took. Theft of 60 million jewels inside a judge's villa. He was tried and sentenced to two years imprisonment. 

In 1968, Lo Presti returned to Bardonecchia and married a compaesana in one of the most luxurious hotels in the city, the Grand Hotel Riky. Among the guests, the well-known American boss Frank Coppola (mobster) known as Frank Tree Fingers and the Gambinos of Cherry Hill, New Jersey. 

In December 1969 he was suspected as the instigator of the Timpano murder. At Exilles, along the Val di Susa provincial road, the body of Vincenzo Timpano from Grotteria, Calabria was found. He was killed by Giuseppe Oppedisano, his brother-in-law. The body was sprinkled with gasoline and set on fire. The Alfa Romeo 1750 owned by Lo Presti was found at the scene of the crime. Oppedisano confessed, but he never revealed the motive. Lo Presti instead had an unassailable alibi. He was flying on a plane to southern Italy. 

In June 1970, just six months later, he was again suspected as the instigator of the D'Aguanno murder. The body of Luigi D'Aguanno was found in an abandoned landfill at Moncalieri, a professional fence just released from prison. Someone said he paid a tip to the police with his life. The police arrested for the murder, Carmine Messina on the car owned by Lo Presti. Also that time Lo Presti was flying on a plane bound for Calabria,but was acquitted of all charges.

From laborer to "godfather" of Bardonecchia
In 1970, Lo Presti began his rise in construction and entered into business relationships with the Sicilians. They were present for some time in Bardonecchia belonging to the Sicilian mafia families of Gambino, Di Maggio, Spatola and Inzerillo crime family of Passo di Rigano, a neighborhood in Palermo. Lo Presti very soon entered into business relations with the brothers Salvatore and Alfonso Gambino, direct cousins with the Gambinos of Cherry Hill, New Jersey, and distant cousins of the Gambino crime family of New York City, New York. They became his loyal employees in the recruitment and exploitation of labor building. He then joined in friendly relations with their cousin, the young Totuccio Salvatore Inzerillo, the future boss of Palermo, still early in his criminal career. 

On May 1, 1971, on Workers' Day in a bar in Turin, a group of Calabrese immigrants engaged in a gunfight. One of whom was Carmelo Manti who left four dead on the ground. They were arms merchants who demanded payment of a bribe which Manti owed them almost 2 million lire. Among the dead was Giuseppe Prochilo. He was a boss of the building racket and the Lo Presti's right-hand man. This massacre lifted the veil and broke the silence in the building racket. Manti, revealed information on the racket. He revealed tenders and subcontracts, exploitation, bribes. He revealed the names of the bosses who controlled the racket. Among the names there was also that of Rocco Lo Presti. Turin discovered an organization sprouted on the misery and suffering of many immigrants. The attention of the newspapers and the judiciary concentrated on Bardonecchia. Through threats, intimidation and abuse of all kinds, he had managed to control the construction workforce in Val di Susa. 

In January 1972 a group of armed  Calabrese workers surrounded a construction site ordering the workers to be evacuated and never be seen again. The job thus passed to Lo Presti. However, when the magistrate began the interrogations, no one remembered anything. Leonardo Ferrero, reporter of l’Unità, who was doing a service on building speculation in Val di Susa was threatened by Lo Presti. The Labor Union was also threatened. The mayor of Bardonecchia, Mario Corino, reported Lo Presti to be a mobster. 

In May 1972, Giovanni Rosace said, in Bardonecchia was an intense traffic of arms and precious items coming from Marseilles controlled by Lo Presti. In the same period, a report by the carabinieri claimed that Lo Presti controlled five clandestine gambling dens in Turin. 

In 1973, the court of Locri, sent his cousin Don Ciccio Francesco Mazzaferro to Bardonecchia in soggiorno obbligato. Together they dominated the field of gaining lucrative contracts such as the construction of the Fréjus Road Tunnel. They started with illegal hiring, abusive exploitation of workers and racket in yards. Through threats and intimidation they were able to control the labor building in Val di Susa.

Developing ties and later exile
In 1973 the Interpol reported the presence of Lo Presti in New York. For his stay in the United States, he was a guest with his wife and daughter of the Gambinos of Cherry Hill, New Jersey. The brothers John, Joseph and Rosario Gambino, cousins of Salvatore Inzerillo and distant cousins of Carlo Gambino. A photo showed Lo Presti sitting at a banquet table with Don Carlo Gambino. He was also present in Canada, first in Ontario and tightened alliances with names of organized crime in Toronto. Rocco Zito, Mike Racco, Cosimo Stalteri, Jimmy De Leo, Remo Commisso and Nick Coluccio. He then went to Montreal, Quebec, and side with Vic Cotroni and Paul Violi. 

In January 1975, a mafia summit in Bardonecchia draw the attention of the Criminalpol was a meeting between Calabrian and Sicilian mobsters took place. Mobsters from the United States were also expected, but they abandoned at the last moment, because of news of a possible police break-in. Instead, the baptism of the second child of Lo Presti occurred. In the spring of the same year, Lo Presti returned to the United States again. Talk about starting 
to build in Miami, Florida, along with John Gambino and Salvatore Inzerillo, but on his return to Italy, the Parliamentary Antimafia Commission, drawn by the numerous articles in the newspaper, made an inspection on the territory of Bardonecchia, and confirmed the presence of organized crime, identifying Lo Presti as the 'Ndrangheta boss of the city. The then superintendent (police) of Turin, Emilio Santillo wrote a voluminous file, on the 'Ndrangheta infiltration in Piedmont, that controlled the building industry with particular reference to Lo Presti. Due to the dossier in 1975, Lo Presti was accused to having all the workforce in the construction industry under his control, and at the request of the chief prosecutor Bruno Caccia, the judge murdered by the 'Ndrangheta of Turin in 1983, Lo Presti was sentenced to three years in exile in the prison on the island of Asinara. On the island, he knew many mafia figures, Luciano Leggio, Tommaso Buscetta, Ignazio Pullarà from Palermo, Giuseppe Di Cristina from Riesi, Rocco Gioffrè from Seminara, Francesco Barbaro from Platì.

The kidnapping-murder Ceretto
In February 1976 he was taken from the island prison of Asinara because he was accused of being the instigator of the Mario Ceretto kidnapping-murder, a wealthy industrialist of Cuorgnè found buried in a field in Orbassano. On May 23, 1975, Ceretto was kidnapped and found dead a week later in the abandoned field. Lo Presti was accused by Giovanni Caggegi to be creator of the kidnapping. Lo Presti in that period, was so powerful that, when Caggegi knew of his arrival, in Le Nuove prison of Turin, he took refuge for three days on the roofs of the prison for fear of retaliation. After the arrest of Lo Presti, the clans in Turin were reorganized. One by one the people close to Lo Presti were eliminated. In February 1977 Carmine Carmelo Messina, who had been involved with Lo Presti in the D'Aguanno murder disappeared. In July 1977, three hooded killers and armed with lupara killed Giuseppe Zucco, originally from Ciminà, in Calabria tied to Lo Presti. He was part of the organization that recruited the labor for the arms racket and had been involved with Lo Presti in the traffic of arms and precious items coming from France with the clan of Marseilles. The other two brothers of Zucco, Rocco and Antonio were also killed, also very close to Lo Presti. Murders to frame everyone in the so-called Faida di Ciminà in Calabria. In July 1978, while the trial of the Ceretto murder was under way, Giuseppe Oppedisano, brother-in-law of Lo Presti, after nine years in jail for the Timpano murder, crowds of jealousy, went out of prison and killed his wife. The victim was Giuseppa Lo Presti, sister of Rocco Lo Presti. In February 1979 Oppedisano committed suicide. He was found hanged in the toilets of the Ferrara mental asylum. Four months earlier Lo Presti was released from prison. For the kidnapping of Ceretto, Lo Presti was sentenced on appeal to 26 years imprisonment. The Supreme Court, however, referred blatantly to irregularities, the case to the Court of Appeal of Genoa, and the trial ended in acquittal for lack of evidence in December 1982. After many years, it was discovered that Lo Presti gave 30 million lire to a Vatican monsignor, Don Simeone Duca, for his intercession with the judge of the Supreme Court. It is said that Don Giovanni Stilo, the priest of Africo, gave him contact with Don Simeone Duca. In 1987 he was arrested for a fraud of three billion pounds to a bank of Cuneo, but that time he was acquitted of all charges. In 1991, Lo Presti requested and obtained criminal rehabilitation. In 1993, nephew Giuseppe Ursino along with fifteen other people were arrested in Bardonecchia for the trafficking of arms and drugs.

Later years
In 1991 Pierluigi Leone, chief police commissioner of Bardonecchia was suddenly transferred to Calabria without reason, just two months after his arrival. Leone had touched strong political interests in Bardonecchia, was investigating the future realization of the Campo Smith complex and had written an investigative report on Lo Presti and proposed a measure of prevention against him. Lo Presti himself had threatened him and made him understand that he was aware of confidential inquiries about him.
In 1995 Lo Presti was re-arrested because of his involvement in the deal Campo Smith. The construction of a mega residence, located in Campo Smith, at the foot of the ski resorts. An investment of 50 billion lire was the biggest work ever made in Bardonecchia after the Fréjus Road Tunnel. According to the indictment Lo Presti was the head of the organization that handled the entire Campo Smith operation. Alessandro Gibello, the mayor of Bardonecchia was unjustly arrested (prosecuted, Alessandro Gibello was acquitted and compensated for damages), and all officials of the municipality were investigated for alleged constraints due to the organized crime. The carabinieri marshal of Bardonecchia was also investigated. All the biggest construction sites in the Bardonecchia were seized by the magistrate and was also involved and arrested Gaetano Belfiore, brother of the well-known boss of the 'Ndrangheta transplanted in Turin, Domenico Mimmo Belfiore. On May 5, 1995, by decree of the government, the council of Bardonecchia was the first and only municipality in northern Italy dissolved for alleged mafia infiltration. The Court seized property and assets to Lo Presti worth 10 billion lire. In April 2001, during the trial Campo Smith, a government witness, said in prison by a certain Musuraci detained in Spain, of a possible Lo Presti involvement, together with the Belfiore and Ursini crime families, in the murder of the Turin chief prosecutor, Bruno Caccia. However, there was not evidence of a direct role of Lo Presti in that murder and no charges stuck. Also the government witnesses, Giacomo Lauro and Francesco Fonti, declared to the judges of the Turin Court, of the existence in Bardonecchia, of a locale of 'Ndrangheta, headed by Rocco Lo Presti and Francesco Mazzaferro, which dated back to the 1970s. The government witness from Palermo, Francesco Lo Vecchio, claimed that Lo Presti and Francesco Mazzaferro, were involved together with other Calabrese, in a large traffic of cocaine from Colombia. But even in this case, the investigators never managed to obtain evidence against Lo Presti.

The rise of the Ursino nephews
From 2000 onwards the criminal structures in Bardonecchia changed. Due to constant pressure from the judiciary and law enforcement agencies, Lo Presti was forced to cede the command scepter to his nephews, the brothers Luciano and Giuseppe Ursino. With this move, Lo Presti hoped to draw less attention to himself. Convinced then, from so many years of impunity, that in the event of judicial troubles, at most they could forbid him to leave Bardonecchia, the law that established the obligatory stay, in the place of residence. The nephew, Luciano Ursino, very soon entered into business relations with the brothers Adolfo and Aldo Cosimo Crea, from Stilo, Calabria, emerging bosses of the 'Ndrangheta of Turin, with a videopoker tour, trimming gaming machines to as many merchants as possible, from Bardonecchia to Turin. 

In 2003, on the eve of the 2006 Winter Olympic Games in Turin, he began to talk about tenders in Val di Susa. The works aroused the interest of the Lo Presti 'ndrina. The first threats arrived. The Works Director of the Turin-Bardonecchia highway (Autostrada A32), and the Turin Agency for 2006 Winter Olympics, received envelopes with bullets. The Ursinos managed to bribe a police inspector who informed them about the investigation and gave them a scanner to find bugs. 

In April 2004, the Ursinos approached a politician to try to obtain European Union funding, and set up a millionaire wear ring, that extended from Bardonecchia to Turin. Among the victims strangled by usury, there was a well-known political figure, who denounced the organization, and in November 2006 Rocco Lo Presti was arrested along with his nephews Ursinos. The Court seized again assets to him worth 2 million euros. Lo Presti spent the last period of life moving from one hospital to another. Lo Presti died of a heart attack on January 23, 2009, in the Department detainment of the Molinette Hospital in Turin at the age of 72, the day after he was sentenced to six years for criminal association with the mafia. Few attended his funeral for fear of police checks. Lo Presti was buried in the Bardonecchia cemetery.

References

How Mafias migrate: the case of the 'Ndrangheta in Northern Italy Federico Varese
Blood Brotherhoods:A History of ItalyOs Three Mafias of John Dickie
Mafias on the Move: How Organized Crime Conquers New Territories of Federico Varese
Globalisation and the mafia of Tim Harford
"Rocco Lo Presti il padrino della Val di Susa". La Stampa. January 24, 2009. 
"Rocco Lo Presti è arrestato all'Asinara".  La Stampa. February 20, 1976. 
"Chiesto dal procuratore il confino per Lo Presti". La Stampa. June 28, 1975.
 A Moncalieri con le manette ai polsi Rocco Lo Presti accusato di omicidio La Stampa February 21, 1976 
Sorpresa al processo Ceretto; 26 anni all'impresario edile Rocco Lo Presti La Stampa November 20, 1980 
Rocco Lo Presti arrestato al cine. Ora andrà al confino per tre anni La Stampa October 14, 1975 
Chiesto dal procuratore il confino per Lo Presti La Stampa 28 giugno 1975 
Lo Presti accompagnato dagli agenti all'Asinara La Stampa 15 ottobre 1975 
Torna libero Lo Presti La Stampa 13 dicembre 1987 
Rocco Lo Presti al confino: Quì finisco che impazzisco La Stampa 2 novembre 1975 
Arrestato Lo Presti boss della Val di Susa La Stampa 13 ottobre 1975 
Il boss arrestato dopo 10 anni di accuse La Stampa 20 febbraio 1976 
Da stuccatore a ricco impresario La Stampa 3 luglio 1975 
Il boss di Bardonecchia in soggiorno all'Asinara La Stampa 13 ottobre 1975
Mandato di cattura per Rocco Lo Presti La Stampa 21 novembre 1980 
Da re di Bardonecchia al confino all'Asinara La Stampa 26 novembre 1987 
La mafia si preparava ad impadronirsi di lavori del Frejus La Stampa 4 aprile 1974 
La mafia ha ucciso Mario Ceretto La Stampa 16 febbraio 1977 
La prima volta del boss di Bardonecchia La Stampa 14 aprile 2002 
Lo Presti torna in tribunale La Stampa 10 gennaio 2002
Il boss di Bardonecchia respinge tutte le accuse La Stampa 29 settembre 1999 
Gli Ursino puntavano ai fondi di Bruxelles La Stampa 6 ottobre 2008 
Rocco Lo Presti deve tornare davanti ai giudici La Stampa 4 novembre 1999 
Gli Ursino i nipoti del boss La Stampa 6 ottobre 2008 
Lo Presti in Procura La Stampa 22 ottobre 1994 
C'è la mafia a Bardonecchia La Stampa 5 ottobre 1994 
Il progetto politico del clan Lo Presti La Stampa 6 ottobre 2008 
Tante accuse e la fedina immacolata La Stampa 14 novembre 1995 
Scandalo usurai. Confiscato il bottino sui conti correnti La Stampa 4 maggio 2007
 Droga e traffico d'armi La Stampa 29 aprile 1993
Luciano Ursino patteggia 4 anni e torna a casa La Stampa 17 aprile 2008 
Da mezzo secolo a Bardonecchia ora riverito ora temuto La Stampa 28 aprile 2007 
Con diecimila euro Zio Rocco evita il carcere La Stampa 28 aprile 2007 
L'usuraio arrivava da Bardonecchia La Stampa 7 novembre 2006 
Il boss calabrese non perde il vizio La Stampa 7 novembre 2007 
Usura, stop alla valanga di patteggiamenti La Stampa 3 maggio 2007 
Bardonecchia comune chiuso per mafia La Stampa 29 aprile 1995 
Bardonecchia, sconcerto e silenzi La Stampa 30 aprile 1995 
Lo Presti pronto a fuggire La Stampa 15 novembre 1995 
Lo Presti resta in carcere La Stampa 17 novembre 1995 
'Ndrangheta in Valsusa. Lo Presti torna in aula La Stampa 15 dicembre 2000
Mafia, chiesti sette anni per Lo Presti La Stampa 31 gennaio 2002 
Il boss tradito dal cellulare La Stampa 14 gennaio 1995 
Troppo zelante fu trasferito La Stampa 6 febbraio 1996 
Sconto in appello per zio Rocco boss della Valsusa La Stampa 21 dicembre 2007  
Rocco Lo Presti resta in carcere La Stampa 8 dicembre 1995 
Processo Lo Presti, l'ora dell'accusa La Stampa 17 gennaio 2001 
Soggiorno obbligato in casa La Stampa 12 luglio 1996 
Lo Presti libero: non è pericoloso La Stampa 8 maggio 1996  
In ospedale Rocco Lo Presti La Stampa 5 dicembre 1995 
Giusto dare la libertà a Lo Presti La Stampa 10 ottobre 1996 
Confermato il soggiorno obbligato La Stampa 11 febbraio 1997 
Attacco finale al clan Lo Presti La Stampa 19 ottobre 2007 
Rocco Lo Presti addio. In Valle tocca ai colonnelli La Stampa 8 gennaio 2008 
Lo Presti ritorna in carcere per usura La Stampa 9 febbraio 2008 
Debiti di poche migliaia di euro diventavano zavorra milionaria La Stampa 9 novembre 2006 
Rocco e il suo compare La Stampa 8 novembre 2006 

Tante accuse e la fedina immacolata La Stampa 14 Novembre 1995

 droga-sequestri-terrorismo-il-dramma-di-una.html

1937 births
2009 deaths
People from the Province of Reggio Calabria
Italian crime bosses